Georgie or George Stone may refer to:

Actors
George E. Stone (1903–1967), Polish-born American actor
Georgie Stone (1909–2010), American silent film child actor in Rio Grande (1920 film)
Georgie Stone (born 2000), Australian actress and transgender rights advocate

Sportsmen
George Stone (outfielder) (1876–1945), American MLB batting champion
George Stone (footballer) (1894–1940), English winger
George Stone (basketball) (1946–1993), American small forward
George Stone (pitcher) (born 1946), American MLB pitcher

Writers
George Stone (bishop) (1708–1764), Irish archbishop and sermon writer
George W. Stone (1811–1894), American legal author, Chief Justice of Alabama Supreme Court
George Frederick Stone (1812–1875), Western Australia Attorney General and census writer
George Cameron Stone (1858–1935), American arms collector and author
George Lawrence Stone (1886–1967), American drummer and author
George Stone (politician) (1907–2001), British socialist journalist
George Stone (composer) (born 1965), American educator and writer

See also
George Stoney (disambiguation)